is a Japanese figure skater.

Daisuke Takahashi may also refer to:

, Japanese footballer
Daisuke Takahashi (mathematician), Japanese mathematician
, Japanese voice actor